Andrew Cant (1584–1663) was a Presbyterian minister and leader of the Scottish Covenanters. About 1623 the people of Edinburgh called him to be their minister, but he was rejected by James I. Ten years later he was minister of Pitsligo in Aberdeenshire, a charge which he left in 1638 for that of Newbattle in Midlothian. In July of that year he went with other commissioners to Aberdeen in the vain attempt to induce the university and the presbytery of that city to subscribe the National Covenant, and in the following November sat in the general assembly at Glasgow which abolished episcopacy in Scotland. In 1638 Cant was minister of Pitsligo in Aberdeenshire. In 1640 he was chaplain to the Scottish army and then settled as minister in Aberdeen. Though a staunch Covenanter, he was a zealous Royalist, preaching before Charles I in Edinburgh, and stoutly advocating the restoration of the monarchy in the time of the Commonwealth. Cant's frequent and bitter verbal attacks on various members of his congregation led in 1661 to complaints laid before the magistrates, in consequence of which he resigned his charge.

Early life and education
Andrew Cant, the  elder, was born in 1584. Nothing  definitely  is  known  as  about his  parentage,  though  it  is  supposed 
with  some  show  of  reason  that  he  was  a native  of  Aberdeen,  and  connected  with the  family  of  Walter  Cant,  formerly  a  bailie of  Leith,  who  on  1  October  1548,  was  admitted to  the  Guildry  of  Aberdeen.  He  has  also 
Educated at  the  Grammar  School  and  King's  College, Aberdeen,  he  graduated  MA.  in  1612.

Early employment
Cant was appointed  Humanist  in  King's  College  in  1614. He was subsequently admitted as  minister  of  Afford sometime before  13  December  1617. This post he demitted  after  26  October  1629,  on  becoming tutor  to  the  only  son  of  Alexander  Forbes, Lord  Pitsligo. He was then admitted  to  Pitsligo  before  20 November  1633.

Church and political endeavours

Cant endeavoured  to  get  up  supplications to  the  Privy  Council  from  the  North against  the  Service  Book  October  1637,  and accompanied  Henderson  of  Leuchars  and Dickson  of  Irvine  to  Aberdeen,  with  this view,  towards  the  end  of  that  year.

Unlike most Aberdonian ministers, Cant was a strong champion of the covenants and opponent of the episcopising endeavours of the king. In July 1638 he was appointed by the ‘commissioners at the tables,’ with two other ministers (Dickson and Henderson) and three noblemen (Montrose, Kinghorn, and Cowper), to endeavour to bring the people of the north into sympathy with the presbyterian cause. The reception of the commissioners by the magistrates of Aberdeen was amusing, the magistrates meeting them and offering them the hospitality of the city, which the commissioners declined, till they should see if they would take the covenant. The ‘Aberdeen doctors’ were famous in the church for their opposition to the covenant, and prepared certain questions for the commissioners, which led to a wordy series of answers, replies, and duplies on either side. The feeling was so strong that the commissioners were excluded from the Aberdeen pulpits, and had to preach in the open air.

Cant was a  member  of  the  Assembly  which  met  at Glasgow  in  1638. Following this he translated,  to  Newbattle  on 20 May  1639. He also served  as  chaplain  with  the Scots  army  at  Newcastle  in  1640. He elected to  St Nicolas', Aberdeen  by  a  Committee  of  Assembly and  admitted on  24  March  1641.

While one of the most unbending sticklers for the covenants, he was a devoted royalist, and on one occasion, in the time of Cromwell, when many English officers were in his church, he uttered so strong sentiments on duty to the king and on the conduct of those who were against him, that the officers rose up and some of them drew their swords and advanced towards the pulpit. The intrepid minister opened his breast, and said to them, ‘Here is the man who uttered these sentiments,’ inviting them to strike him if they dared. ‘He had once been a captain,’ says Wodrow, who tells the story, ‘and was one of the most bold and resolute men of his day.’ His dauntless courage, with his stirring popular eloquence, gave him a wide fame.

Cant was  a  member of  all  the  Commissions  of  Assembly, 1642-9. Financially, Cant  had  2000  merks  allowed  him  by Parliament,  4  February  1646,  for  his  services and  losses. Andrew Cant was  elected  Moderator  of  the General  Assembly  on 10  July  1650.  Joined the  Protesters  in  1651 taking their side against the Resolutioners. Cant  became  rector  of King's  College  in  1651. Cant is  said  to  have been  deposed  on  a  charge  of  circulating Rutherford's  Lex  Rex,  but  probably  demitted in  1660.

Death and legacy

He died  on 27  April  1663. He is buried in the graveyard of the Kirk of St Nicholas on Union Street. The flat slab marking is grave lies midway along the west wall. It gives his birthdate as 1584.

Works
On  the Titles  of  Our  Blessed  Saviour  (Aberdeen, n.d.)
Sermon  preached  in  the  Greyfriars Church,  Edinburgh,  in  June  1638  (Edinburgh, 1699  and  1720)
The  Evil  and Danger  of  Prelacy  (Edinburgh,  1699  and 1720 ;  Glasgow,  1741)
Essay  on  Church Government  (Edinburgh,  1703)
A  Discourse and  Exhortation  at  renewing  the  National Covenant(Hamilton, 1713; Edinburgh, 1727;  Glasgow,  1741  and  1841)

Family

He  married  Margaret Irvine,  who  was  buried  28  March  1679, and  had  issue —
James
Alexander,  minister of  Banchory-Ternan
Andrew, Principal  of  University  of  Edinburgh (1675–1685).
Margaret, died  unmarried  1660
Sarah  (married 4  May  1647,  as  his  second  wife,  Alexander Jaffray  of  Kingswells),  died  a Quaker  in 1673.

Bibliography
Lamont's  Diary,  10,  21
Scottish  Notes  and Queries,  iii.,  84-8
Aberdeen  Sasines,  i.  187,  v. 121,  359
Watt's  Aberdeen, 258,  262
Wodrow's  Analecta,  ii 154, 161, 189, 374;  iii, 126, 414
Select  Biographies  [Wodrow  Society],  i.,  311.

References

Citations

Sources

17th-century Ministers of the Church of Scotland
1590 births
1663 deaths
Rectors of the University of Aberdeen
Covenanters
Moderators of the General Assembly of the Church of Scotland